The Outback Xplorer is an Australian passenger train service operated by NSW TrainLink between Sydney and Broken Hill via the Main Western line. Commencing in March 1996, it was initially a locomotive-pulled service. It ceased in 2000 due to the poor state of the passenger carriages, but resumed in 2002 using Xplorer sets.

History
CountryLink commenced operating the service in March 1996 honouring a commitment by the Carr State Government to reintroduce a rail service to Broken Hill which had lost its rail service when the Silver City Comet was replaced by a road coach service in November 1989. 

Unofficially known as the Outback Express, it was initially formed of 1940s vintage locomotive-hauled HUB/RUB carriages, usually hauled by a Clyde Engineering built 81 class locomotive. In April 2000, the service ceased due to the condition of the carriages. 

In 2002, the service resumed with Xplorer railcars, operating as a set of three with carriage numbering A (first class and buffet car), B (economy) and D (economy with disability access seating area/toilet facilities). Since the introduction of Xplorer railcars, the service runs to Broken Hill on Mondays, returning to Sydney on Tuesdays.

References

Transport in Broken Hill, New South Wales
Named passenger trains of New South Wales
Passenger rail transport in New South Wales
Railway services introduced in 1996
1996 establishments in Australia
Australian outback